WRF may refer to:

 Weather Research and Forecasting model, a numerical weather prediction system
 Westminster Russia Forum, a UK organization promoting improved relations with Russia 
 Wiley Rein & Fielding, a Washington, DC based law firm
 World Reformed Fellowship, an ecumenical Christian organization
 World Resources Forum, the global science-based platform for sharing knowledge about sustainable resource management